The COOL-ER is a discontinued e-book reader from UK company Interead. The device is compatible with both Mac and Windows computers, comes in a variety of colors, and supports e-books in English, Spanish, Portuguese, German, French, Dutch, Russian, Korean, Ukrainian, Mandarin and Japanese. The device is commonly compared with the Amazon Kindle. Reviewers cite the lower price, MP3 support, and lighter weight as advantages; but complain of the COOL-ER's lack of wireless connectivity and button insensitivity. On 8 June 2010, Interead went into liquidation after failing to secure funding.

Specifications

Dimensions 
Height (mm): 183
Width (mm): 117.74
Depth (mm): 10.89
Volume (litres): 0.23
Weight (g): 178

Screen
Size: 6"
DPI: 170 pixels per inch
Levels of Greyscale: 8
Type: E Ink Vizplex
Manufacturer: PVI (E Ink)

Hardware
Storage: 1 GB
Memory: 128 MB
Processor: Samsung S3C2440 ARM 400 MHz
Battery: Li-Polymer battery (1000 mAh)
Battery Life: 8000 page turns
Memory Expansion: SD (up to 4GB)
Wireless: No

Compatibility
PC: Yes
Mac: Yes
Supported formats: PDF, EPUB, FB2, RTF, TXT, HTML, PRC, JPG, MP3

References

External links
Adobe Digital Editions, Supported ebook devices
PVI (E Ink)

Dedicated ebook devices
Electronic paper technology
Linux-based devices